John Wesley Ryles (born December 2, 1950) is an American country music artist. Ryles recorded a string of hit country songs, beginning in 1968 when he was still a teenager, and continuing through the 1980s. He no longer records as a headline artist but remains active in the music industry as a session musician.

Biography
At age 17, he made his debut in 1968 with the single "Kay", a Top Ten hit on the Billboard Hot Country Singles (now Hot Country Songs) charts, and the title track to his debut album for Columbia Records.

Ryles later recorded one album, Reconsider Me, for the Plantation label, which produced a No. 39 single in its title track. It was followed by two non-album singles, "Tell It Like It Is" and "When a Man Loves a Woman," both on the Music Mill label in 1976.

He then moved to Dot Records. His first single on ABC/Dot, "Fool", Made it to No. 18 on the Hot Country chart followed by his highest-peaking single, the No. 5 "Once in a Lifetime Thing." When that label merged with MCA Records, he issued the album Let the Night Begin there. The first single, "Liberated Woman" climbed to No. 14 on the Billboard Hot Country chart. It was followed by a rendition of "Always on My Mind, which went to #20 on the Billboard Hot Country chart.." The last song released from this album, "Perfect Strangers", reached No. 24 on the Billboard chart.

Two more singles followed on the Primero label: "We've Got to Start Meeting Like This" and "Just Once," followed by "She Took It Too Well" on 16th Avenue Records in 1984. The last label for which he recorded was Warner Bros. Records between 1987 and 1988. Although he reached Top 20 with "Louisiana Rain" during his stay on Warner, he did not release an album for the label.

Since the release of his last single in 1988, Ryles has served primarily as a background vocalist. Ryles is married to Joni Lee, the daughter of country singer Conway Twitty.

Discography

Albums

Singles

APeaked at No. 83 on Billboard Hot 100 and No. 88 on RPM Top Singles.
BCredited to John Wesley Ryles I.

References

1950 births
Living people
People from Bastrop, Louisiana
American country singer-songwriters
Columbia Records artists
Dot Records artists
MCA Records artists
Singer-songwriters from Louisiana
Warner Records artists
16th Avenue Records artists
Country musicians from Louisiana